Dalton Alan Munaretto or simply Dalton (born September 8, 1986 in Chapecó), is a Brazilian goalkeeper who plays for Vitória.

Dalton played for Figueirense in the 2009 Campeonato Brasileiro Série B.

He was in 2010 on a trial with Azerbaijani side FK Khazar Lankaran.

Honours
Santa Catarina State League: 2006

Contract
20 April 2005 to 19 April 2008

References

External links
 Dalton at ZeroZero
 Guardian Stats Centre
 figueirense.com
 sambafoot

1986 births
Living people
Brazilian footballers
Figueirense FC players
Mirassol Futebol Clube players
Rio Claro Futebol Clube players
Guaratinguetá Futebol players
Paysandu Sport Club players
Association football goalkeepers
Parauapebas Futebol Clube players